The elite are a group or class deemed to be in some way superior.

Elite or ELITE may also refer to:

Buildings
 Elite Tower, a skyscraper under construction in Ramat Gan, Israel
 Elite Towers, a partially built building complex in Dubai, United Arab Emirates

Fonts and typefaces
 Prestige Elite, a typeface
 Elite, a 1969 font designed by Aldo Novarese

Literature 
 The Elite (novel), a novel in the Selection series by Kiera Cass
 The Elite (DC Comics), a group of super-powered anti-heroes in DC Comics

Music
 Elite (album), an album by Within the Ruins
 "Elite" (song), a song by Deftones from White Pony
 Elite (record producer) or Anthony Parrino, producer 
 Tyshane or Elite, producer

Products
 Beretta Elite II, an air pistol
 Elite Stratocaster, an electric guitar model
 Europa Elite a light aircraft
 Murphy Elite, a light aircraft
 Pioneer Elite, a line of high-end electronics
 E'Lite, a small-form-factor microcomputer

Sports
 Elite SC, a football club in the Cayman Islands
 The Elite (professional wrestling), professional wrestling trio, later expanding into a stable
 Elitedivisionen, the highest-level league competition for women's football clubs in Denmark

Television 
 The Elite (audio drama), an audio drama based on the TV series Doctor Who
 Élite (TV series), a Netflix TV series

Vehicles
 Ford Elite, a two-door coupe (1974–1976)
 Honda Elite, a series of scooters
 Lotus Elite, two vehicles from Lotus Cars
 Plaxton Elite, a bus coach body

Video gaming
 Elite (video game series), a space combat and trading video game series introduced in 1984
 Elite (video game), first video game in the series
 Elite Systems, a UK video game developer
 Xbox 360 Elite, a video game console from Microsoft
 Elite (Halo), a fictional alien race from the Halo series
 Call of Duty: Elite, a social networking service that supports games in Activision's Call of Duty franchise

Other uses
 Elite (company), an Israeli food manufacturer and part of Strauss Group
 Elite (restaurant), a restaurant in Helsinki, Finland
 Elite Model Management, a modeling agency
 North–South Expressway Central Link or ELITE Highway, an expressway in Malaysia
 Early versus Late Intervention Trial with Estradiol (ELITE), a clinical trial

See also
 Elite Force (disambiguation)
 Sleek the Elite (Paul Nakad; born 1975), Australian hip-hop artist and actor
 
 Leet, an alternative alphabet for English that is used on the Internet and by gamers